Sir Theodore Beal Pritchett  (born 1890, died 1969), was Lord Mayor of Birmingham and a Deputy Lieutenant of Warwickshire.

He was educated at Bromsgrove School and served in the Royal Artillery during World War I, being awarded the Military Cross.

He was a Councillor on Birmingham City Council from 1924 to 1939, before being appointed as an Alderman. He was Lord Mayor of Birmingham for 1939–40.

A Deputy Lieutenant for Warwickshire, he was knighted in the 1953 Coronation Honours List and was awarded the Freedom of the City of Birmingham on 7 May 1960.

He was club president of Aston Villa when Doug Ellis was first appointed chairman of the club in 1968

References
Hankinson, C. F. J. (ed.), Debrett's Baronetage, Knightage and Companionage, 1954, Odhams Press, 1964
Deadly Doug by Doug Ellis quoted in the first chapter of his autobiography that he was approached by club president Sir Theodore Pritchettt

1890 births
Royal Artillery officers
Recipients of the Military Cross
Knights Bachelor
Deputy Lieutenants of Warwickshire
People educated at Bromsgrove School
British Army personnel of World War I
Mayors of Birmingham, West Midlands
Year of death unknown